Chillington may refer to:

 Chillington, Devon
 Chillington, Somerset
 Chillington Hall, Staffordshire
 Chilton, Wisconsin, originally named Chillington after one of the English towns